W. W. M. R. Dickson Sarathchandra Dela is a former Provincial governor and former Sri Lankan High Commissioner to the Maldives. Dela has held the offices of the Governor of Northern Province and of Sabaragamuwa. He is the father of Pradeep Nilanga Dela, the Diyawadana Nilame

Political career
Dickson Sarathchandra Dela was sworn in as Governor of Sabaragamuwa, by President Mahinda Rajapaksa, on 22 February 2008 which held until October of the same year. Leaving the governorship of Sabaragamuwa he became the Governor of Northern Province for a further nine months resigning to take over as the Sri Lankan High Commissioner to the Maldives in 2009 & which held until 2015.

References

External links

Governors of the Northern Provincial Council - History of Governors
Sri Lankan Provinces from 1988 

|-

|-

Living people
Governors of Northern Province, Sri Lanka
Governors of Sabaragamuwa Province
High Commissioners of Sri Lanka to the Maldives
Alumni of Thurstan College
Year of birth missing (living people)